Puthradharmam is a 1954 Indian Malayalam-language film, directed by Vimal Kumar and produced by K. V. Koshy. The film stars Prem Nazir and Kumari Thankam. The film had musical score by P. S. Divakar.

The film was remade in Tamil as Nalla Penmani. The film was released 1954.

Cast 
 Jagathy N. K. Achari
 Thikkurissy Sukumaran Nair
 T. R. Omana
 Lakshmi Bai
 Anilkumar
 Nanukkuttan
 Bahadoor
 Veeran

Soundtrack 
P. S. Divakar composed the music for both Malayalam and Tamil versions.
Malayalam songs (Puthradharmam)
Lyrics were penned by Abhayadev. Playback singers are P. B. Sreenivas, P. Leela & Lilly Koshy.

Tamil songs (Nalla Penmani)
Lyrics were penned by Kambadasan & A. S. Rajagopal. Playback singers are A. M. Rajah, R. Balasaraswathi Devi, A. P. Komala & Kumari Kamini.

References

External links 
 

1954 films
1950s Malayalam-language films
Films directed by Vimal Kumar